The 2002 Dwars door Vlaanderen was the 57th edition of the Dwars door Vlaanderen cycle race and was held on 27 March 2002. The race started in Kortrijk and finished in Waregem. The race was won by Baden Cooke.

General classification

References

2002
2002 in road cycling
2002 in Belgian sport
March 2002 sports events in Europe